Criollo (or Creole) is a group of cattle breeds descended from Iberian stock imported to the Americas, including among others

 In the Caribbean:
 Cuban Criollo
 Puerto Rican Criollo
 In South America:
 Argentine Criollo
 Bolivian Criollo
 Chinampo
 Colombian Criollo
 Crioulo (Chimarrão) types:
 Brazilian Polled
 Caracu
 Curraleio
 Crioulo Lageano (Crioulo de Santa Catarina; Franqueiro) 
 Pantaneiro
 Polled Crioulo Pereira Camargo
 Ecuador Criollo
 Romosinuano
 Uruguayan Criollo
 Venezuelan Criollo
 In Central America:
 Barroso 
 Tropical Dairy Criollo (Criollo lechero tropical)
 In North America:
 Corriente a.k.a. Chinampo 
 Florida Cracker
 Frijolillo 
 Pineywoods
 Raramuri Criollo
 Texas Longhorn

References

Cattle breeds originating in Spain